Lucien March (6 December 1859 – 4 April 1933) was a French demographer, statistician, and engineer.

In 1878 Lucien March enrolled in l'École polytechnique and after graduation in 1880 served in the corps of naval artillery. He was the director of the Statistique générale de la France (SGF) from 1896 to 1920. In 1896, he introduced Hollerith punched card tabulating machines into France and later invented an improved machine, the "classifier-counter-printer", which was used until the 1940s. He also arranged a sorting process using the workplace addresses of the people counted in the French population census to generate valuable economic data and labor statistics.

He was an Invited Speaker of the ICM in 1908 at Rome, in 1924 at Toronto, and in 1928 at Bologna.

In 1912, upon his return from an international congress on eugenics, held in London, March helped to found a French eugenics society, which published in 1922 Eugénique et Sélection, a collection of essays on eugenics. In the 1920s he played an important role in the International Federation of Eugenics Organizations.

Selected publications
 "Les représentations graphiques et la statistique comparative." Journal de la société française de statistique 45 (1904): 407-420.
 "Comparaison numérique de courbes statistiques." Journal de la société française de statistique 46 (1905): 255-277. 
 "Remarques sur la terminologie en statistique." Journal de la société française de statistique 49 (1908): 290-296.
 Some researches concerning the factors of mortality. Journal of the Royal Statistical Society, 75 (1912): 505–538. 
 Mouvement des prix et des salaires pendant la guerre, publication de la Dotation Carnegie pour la Paix internationale, Paris, Puf, 1925.
 "Différences et corrélation en statistique." Journal de la société française de statistique 69 (1928): 38-63.
 La statistique et sa méthode …, Masson et Cie, 137 pages, 1928 
 Différences et corrélation en statistique, Berger-Levrault, 29 pages, 1928 
 Les principes de la méthode statistique: avec quelques applications aux sciences naturelles et à la science des affaires, Librairie Félix Alcan, 807 pages, 1930

References

External links
 Lucien March (1859–1933): Inventeur du métier moderne de statisticiens, INSEE

French engineers
French statisticians
1859 births
1933 deaths